Rossiya (Russian and Tajik: Россия, also Kolkhozi Rossiya; formerly: Qushteppa) is a jamoat in Tajikistan. It is located in Rudaki District, one of the Districts of Republican Subordination. The jamoat has a total population of 31,030 (2015).

References

Populated places in Districts of Republican Subordination
Jamoats of Tajikistan